María Victoria Martín Martín (born 11 March 1973), better known as Vicky Martín Berrocal, is a Spanish fashion designer, television presenter, and actress.

Biography
Vicky Martín Berrocal is the daughter of Victoria Martín Serrano and cattle entrepreneur José Luis Martín Berrocal. She was born in Huelva and grew up in Seville. Since she was a child, she trained in the best schools in Madrid and Switzerland and graduated in Marketing and Business Sciences. She began working as an agent for bullfighters, where she met her husband .

She later entered the world of fashion, and found success collaborating with the designer . In this way, she began to be known internationally and to dress celebrities such as Uma Thurman, who wore her designs on the Campari calendar. Her collections include festive costumes, flamenco dresses, bridal gowns, handbags, and costume jewelry. Martín Berrocal also had her own special edition of Nocilla glasses.

In addition, Martín Berrocal has been linked to the world of television. From 2005 to 2008 she was a participant on the Cuatro magazine program . In 2006, she competed in the monologue contest , where she finished second. In 2007, she was a judge on Supermodelo. From 2008 to 2009 she was a contestant on TVE's Mira quién baila. In addition, she debuted as a presenter on the CMM TV program  from 2009 to 2013.

As an actress, she played the role of Laura in the series  in 2007, and in 2015 she had a cameo on the Cuatro series .

Recognitions
In 2015, she received the Escaparate Award for best flamenco fashion.

In 2018, toy manufacturer Mattel created the "Inspiring Women" series of Barbie dolls dedicated to women who have left their mark in history, including one based on Martín Berrocal.

Personal life
In October 1997 Martín Berrocal married the bullfighter  in Seville, with whom she had had a courtship since 1993. In December 1999 they had their only daughter, Alba. They divorced in October 2001. In 2018, he began a relationship with the Portuguese businessman João Viegas Soares.

Filmography

TV programs

Fiction TV series

References

External links
 
 

1973 births
Living people
People from Huelva
Spanish fashion designers
Spanish television actresses
Spanish television presenters
21st-century Spanish businesswomen
21st-century Spanish businesspeople
Spanish women fashion designers
Spanish women television presenters